Anastasia Pozdeeva (born 12 June 1993) is a Russian footballer. She plays as a midfielder for Zenit and the Russia national team.

Club career
She played for Zvezda 2005 Perm since 2012. She won her first title at her debutant season by winning the 2013 edition of the Russian Women's Cup.

International career
She took part in 2011 UEFA Women's U-19 Championship. She was called up to be part of the national team for the UEFA Women's Euro 2013.

Personal life
Pozdeeva was born in Samara.

Honours
Zvezda 2005 Perm
Winner
 Russian Women's Cup: 2013

Meaningful Goals

References

External links
 
 
 
 Profile at soccerdonna.de 

1993 births
Living people
Russian women's footballers
Sportspeople from Samara, Russia
Russia women's international footballers
CSK VVS Samara (women's football club) players
Zvezda 2005 Perm players
Women's association football midfielders
ZFK CSKA Moscow players
Russian Women's Football Championship players
UEFA Women's Euro 2017 players